is a Japanese footballer who plays for Blaublitz Akita.

Club statistics
Updated to 23 February 2016.

References

External links

Profile at Blaublitz Akita

1988 births
Living people
Toyo University alumni
Association football people from Chiba Prefecture
Japanese footballers
J3 League players
Japan Football League players
Blaublitz Akita players
Association football defenders
Akita FC Cambiare players